Daviesia squarrosa is a species of flowering plant in the family Fabaceae and is endemic to eastern Australia. It is a slender shrub with crowded, heart-shaped phyllodes with a long-tapering tip, and yellow and red flowers.

Description
Flowering occurs from July October and the fruit is a flattened 

Taxonomy and naming
Daviesia squarrosa was first formally described in 1805 by James Edward Smith in his book Annals of Botany. The specific epithet (squarrosa) means "thickly crowded and rigid", referring to the leaves.

Distribution
This species of pea grows in forest, mainly in near-coastal areas, from south-east Queensland to the Tuross River in New South Wales, but also as far inland as the Megalong Valley and Goulburn.

References

squarrosa
Flora of New South Wales
Flora of Queensland
Plants described in 1805
Taxa named by James Edward Smith